Alcohol law in Washington may refer to:

 Alcohol law in Washington (state)
 Alcohol law in Washington, D.C.